The International Day of Clean Air for blue skies is designated by the United Nations General Assembly on 7 September to strengthen international cooperation in improving air quality and reducing air pollution. The designation was made through the Assembly resolution 74/212, and adopted at that session's 52nd plenary meeting on 19 December 2019.

The resolution was adopted without a vote, generally indicating all countries recognized the importance of the subject, were united on the issue, and no obvious divisions were present.

In that resolution, the General Assembly emphasized "the need to strengthen international cooperation at the global, regional and subregional levels in various areas related to improving air quality, including the collection and utilization of data, joint research and development, and the sharing of best practices." It includes a specific focus on the disproportionate effect of poor air quality on women, children and older persons.

The International Day aims to raise awareness on the importance of clean air for health, productivity, the economy and the environment; demonstrate the close link of air quality to other environmental and developmental challenges such as climate change; promote solutions that improve air quality by sharing actionable knowledge best practices, innovations, and success stories; and bring together diverse actors for concerted national, regional and international approaches for effective air quality management.

The first observance of the International Day was held on 7 September 2020, with events held around the world. However, owing to the COVID-19 pandemic, a majority of the commemorative events were held virtually. The lead coordinating partners of the International Day were the United Nations Environment Programme (UNEP) and the Climate and Clean Air Coalition to Reduce Short-Lived Climate Pollutants (CCAC), with additional funding from the Federal Ministry of the Environment, Nature Conservation and Nuclear Safety of Germany (BMU). In some of the commemorations, the World Health Organization partnered with the NGO BreatheLife to coordinate some activities for the day.

See also 

Earth Day
List of environmental dates
List of international observances

References

External links 

 

Environmental awareness days
United Nations days
September observances
Recurring events established in 2019
Air pollution